Space Heater is the fifth album by Reverend Horton Heat, released by Interscope Records in March 1998.  It charted on the Billboard 200, reaching number 187. "Pride of San Jacinto" appears in the videogame Hot Wheels Turbo Racing.

Album art
The front-cover album art is a parody of 1950s horror movie posters.  It plays on a double entendre, turning 1950s-era space heaters into alien spacecraft invading from outer space, complete with search lights or tractor beams.

Track listing
"Pride of San Jacinto" (Wallace) – 3:13
"Lie Detector" (Heath) – 3:24
"Hello Mrs. Darkness" (Heath) – 3:11
"Jimbo Song" (Heath/Wallace) – 2:21
"Revolution Under Foot" (Heath/Wallace/Churilla) – 4:29
"Starlight Lounge" (Heath) – 2:48
"Goin' Manic" (Heath/Churilla/Wallace) – 4:27
"Mi Amor" (Heath) – 3:05
"For Never More" (Heath/Wallace/Churilla) – 2:53
"The Prophet Stomp" (Heath) – 3:02
"Native Tongue of Love" (Heath) – 3:17
"Couch Surfin'" (Heath/Churilla) – 4:02
"Cinco de Mayo" (Heath/Churilla/Wallace/Stasium) – 2:11
"Texas Rock-A-Billy Rebel" (Heath) – 2:47
"Baby I'm Drunk" (Heath) – 3:11
"Space Heater" (Heath/Churilla/Wallace) – 9:47

Personnel

Jim "Reverend Horton" Heath - guitars, vocals, harmonica (on "Pride of San Jacinto" and "Goin' Manic"), ukulele (on "The Prophet Stomp")
Jimbo Wallace - upright bass, backing vocals
Scott Churilla - drums, backing vocals (on "Jimbo Song" and "Couch Surfin')
Tim Alexander - piano (on "Lie Detector"), accordion on ("Mi Amor")
Ed Stasium - producer, recorder, mixer
Phillip Green - assistant recorder
Marvin Hlavenka - assistant recorder
Junichi Murakawa - assistant mixer
Greg Calbi - mastering
Tom Whalley - A&R direction
Scott Weiss - management
Jeffrey Taylor Light - legal
Unleashed - art direction + design
Lisa Peardon - photography

Charts

References

1998 albums
The Reverend Horton Heat albums
Albums produced by Ed Stasium
Interscope Records albums